Boomchild is the third solo album from Dennis DeYoung. It was released in February 1989 by MCA Records. Boomchild featured the title track with a music video but the song was relegated to the B-Side of "Beneath The Moon", the only single. Both the single and Boomchild  failed to chart and the album has since been out of print.

Track listing
All songs written by Dennis DeYoung, except as noted:

 "Beneath the Moon" – 4:42
 "The Best Is Yet to Come" – 4:15
 "What a Way to Go" – 4:45
 "Harry's Hands" – 4:52
 "Boomchild" – 4:56
 "Who Shot Daddy?" – 4:33
 "Outside Looking In Again" – 5:23
 "Won't Go Wasted" (DeYoung, Rob Friedman) – 4:20

Personnel
Dennis DeYoung: keyboards, piano, synthesizers, vocals
Tom Dziallo: guitars
Bob Lizik: bass guitar
John Robinson: drums
Joe Pusateri: percussion
Bill Ruppert: guitars
John Adair: guitars, acoustic guitar
C.J. Vanston: synthesizers, piano, bass guitar
Howard Levy: harmonica on "The Best Is Yet to Come" and "Who Shot Daddy?"
Wayne Stewart: drums on "Who Shot Daddy?"
Chris Cameron: additional synthesizers on "Who Shot Daddy?"
Steve Eisen: tenor saxophone on "Who Shot Daddy?"
Mike Smith: baritone saxophone on "Who Shot Daddy?"
Mark Ohlson: trumpet on "Who Shot Daddy?"
Obert Davis: trumpet on "Who Shot Daddy?"
Mike Halperin: trombone on "Who Shot Daddy?"
Mark Williamson, Jeff Morrow, Gary Pigg, Tamara Champlin, Bill Champlin, Dawn Feusi, Gary Loizzo, The 101st Place Singers, Sean Christopher, Francine Smith, Cynthia Harrell, Dennis DeYoung: additional backing vocals

References

External Links 

 Official Website of Dennis DeYoung

1988 albums
Dennis DeYoung albums
MCA Records albums
Albums produced by Alan Shacklock